Osvaldo Alejandro Nicanor Urrutia Soto (born 28 November 1951) is a Chilean civil engineer who currently serves as deputy.

References

External Links
 BCN Profile

1951 births
Living people
20th-century Chilean politicians
21st-century Chilean politicians
Independent Democratic Union politicians
Pontifical Catholic University of Valparaíso alumni
Mayors of places in Chile
Members of the Chamber of Deputies of Chile
Chilean civil engineers
People from Valparaíso